The 1924–25 Luxembourg National Division was the 15th season of top level association football in Luxembourg.

Overview
It was contested by 8 teams. The individual results recorded suggest that Stade Dudelange should have won on goal average (42:14 to 41:14 when equal on 21 points with CA Spora Luxembourg). CA Spora Luxembourg won 2–0 at Home, and end up tie 2–2 Away.
However, CA Spora Luxembourg are always recorded as having won the title.

League standings

Results

References
Luxembourg - List of final tables (RSSSF)

Luxembourg National Division seasons
Lux
Nat